Charlie Moreno (born November 8, 1978 in El Paso, Texas) is an American stand-up comic and an actor. His comedy routines are known for being dark and morbid, and often include humorous tales from his traumatic life.

Partial television appearances 
 The People's Court (2001)
 Law & Order (2002)
 Third Watch (2002)
 Evening At The Apollo (2003)

External links

 CharlieMoreno.net

1978 births
Living people
American stand-up comedians
American male actors
21st-century American comedians